The 2018 NCAA Division I Baseball season, play of college baseball in the United States organized by the National Collegiate Athletic Association (NCAA) at the Division I level, began in February 2018. The season progressed through the regular season, many conference tournaments and championship series, and concluded with the 2018 NCAA Division I baseball tournament and 2018 College World Series. The College World Series, consisting of the eight remaining teams in the NCAA tournament and held annually in Omaha, Nebraska, at TD Ameritrade Park Omaha, ended on June 28, 2018.

Realignment and format changes
 NYIT, previously the last remaining Division I independent, moved its baseball program to its full-time home of the Division II East Coast Conference.
 Buffalo dropped their baseball program at the end of the 2017 season, leaving the Mid-American Conference with 10 teams. As a result, the MAC dissolved its divisions.
 The Ivy League dissolved its divisions, playing in a single league table for the first time since 1992.  The top two finishers will meet in the Championship Series.
 Wichita State left the Missouri Valley Conference for the American Athletic Conference.
 Valparaiso left the Horizon League for the Missouri Valley Conference.

The 2018 season was also the last for two other teams in their then-current conferences. Both teams moved between the same two conferences, but in opposite directions.
 Liberty, after 27 seasons in the Big South Conference, joined the Atlantic Sun Conference (ASUN) on July 1, 2018.
 USC Upstate, after 11 years in the ASUN, moved to the Big South.

Finally, one other Division I team changed its institutional and athletic identities immediately after the 2017–18 season. Indiana University and Purdue University dissolved Indiana University – Purdue University Fort Wayne (IPFW) on July 1, 2018. IPFW's academic programs in health sciences transferred to the IU system as Indiana University Fort Wayne; all remaining academic programs were transferred to the Purdue system as Purdue University Fort Wayne (PFW). From 2018 to 2019, the former IPFW athletic program represents only PFW, and its Summit League membership was assumed by PFW. Shortly before the dissolution took effect, but after the school's baseball season had finished, the athletic program announced that it would henceforth be known as the Purdue Fort Wayne Mastodons.

NCAA tournament
For the first time, the 2018 NCAA Division I baseball tournament seeded the top 16 teams, rather than only the top 8 teams as had been the practice since 1999.  This ensures that the regional featuring the top-seeded team is paired with the regional hosted by the 16th-seeded team, where in the past Super Regionals were paired generally along geographical lines.

Ballpark changes
 Boston College opened the new 1,000-seat Brighton Field on their Brighton campus.  The Eagles left their home of 57 years, Eddie Pellagrini Diamond at John Shea Field to create room for a new athletics field house.
 The 2018 season was the last for Kentucky at Cliff Hagan Stadium. The Wildcats moved into the new Kentucky Proud Park for the 2019 season.
 The 2018 season was also the last for UConn at J. O. Christian Field.  The Huskies will play elsewhere for 2019 while a new stadium is built.

Season outlook

Conference standings

Conference winners and tournaments
Of the 31 Division I athletic conferences that sponsor baseball, 29 end their regular seasons with a single-elimination tournament or a double elimination tournament. The teams in each conference that win their regular season title are given the number one seed in each tournament. Two conferences, the Big West and Pac-12, do not hold a conference tournament. The winners of these tournaments, plus the Big West and Pac-12 regular-season champions, receive automatic invitations to the 2018 NCAA Division I baseball tournament.

College World Series

The 2018 College World Series began on June 16 in Omaha, Nebraska.

Coaching changes
This table lists programs that changed head coaches at any point from the first day of the 2018 season until the day before the first day of the 2019 season.

References